The 2016 Humboldt State Lumberjacks football team represented Humboldt State University during the 2016 NCAA Division II football season. Humboldt State competed in the Great Northwest Athletic Conference (GNAC).

The 2016 Lumberjacks were led by ninth-year head coach Rob Smith. They played home games at the Redwood Bowl in Arcata, California. Humboldt State finished the season with a record of six wins and five losses (6–5, 3–5 GNAC). The Lumberjacks outscored their opponents 333–321 for the 2016 season.

Schedule

References

Humboldt State
Humboldt State Lumberjacks football seasons
Humboldt State Lumberjacks football